BSW may refer to:
Bachelor of Social Work, an academic qualification at some institutions
Bally Sports West, American regional sports network owned and operated by Bally Sports
Batesville Southwestern Railroad
Birmingham Snow Hill railway station, Birmingham, England (National Rail station code: BSW)
Black Sidewall is a characteristic of a tire used in the reference code.
Blind Spot Warning, an auto-safety capability
Boswell Bay Airport (IATA: BSW)
BrettspielWelt, an online boardgame portal
British School of Washington, a DC area private school specializing in British and international curriculum
British Standard Whitworth, an imperial-unit based screw-thread standard
Byelorussian Steel Works
BSW Weert, a Dutch professional basketball team